Fifth formers of St. Clare's is the sixth novel of the St. Clare's series written by Enid Blyton. It was published in 1945 by Methuen.

Plot summary
Miss Cornwallis is mistress of the fifth form. Hilary Wentworth is a calm and dignified head-girl. Being in the fifth form means quite a lot of changes – for example, the girls have got studies of their own now, instead of common rooms and dormitories, the first – and second-formers have got to work for them. For some reason, Mirabel has been made games captain for the school, and Gladys vice captain. It is not explained why or how Mirabel has developed such good sporting abilities, nor is it explained why she is no longer musical. In her first term at St Clare's she was written as a very musical girl, talented at the piano and the violin.

Two girls use their new power badly - Angela Favorleigh takes advantage of her prettiness and charm and turns the younger girls into willing slaves and so does Mirabel, who is games captain. Some room is made for the second-form - Antoinette, Claudine's little sister, has come to St. Clare's, too, and she proves to be as irrepressible as Claudine.

There are three new girls in the fifth form and all of them are unpopular – Anne-Marie, who fancies herself a poet, Felicity Ray, a musical genius, and Alma, a fat girl who suffers from what nowadays would be called an eating disorder. Felicity's parents are very ambitious and, in spite of Miss Theobald's warnings, push their daughter too hard – she is to take a very difficult musical exam and works herself too hard.

One part of the book describes fat Alma stealing food from a store cupboard that Antoinette keeps midnight feast food in. Alison discovers the cupboard open one day and reports to Claudine (who owns the cupboard) about it, and Claudine then keeps the key to the cupboard safe. Alma is angry, and plays tricks on Alison.

Pat and Isabel are minor characters in this book, but at the end they are made head-girls because Hilary will leave St. Clare's and go to India to live with her parents. Alison, Anne-Marie, Angela, and Mirabel all redeem themselves at the end of the book.

References

External links

Enid Blyton Society page

St. Clare's novels
1945 British novels
1945 children's books
Methuen Publishing books